Anders Kallur (born July 6, 1952) is a Swedish former professional ice hockey player. He was a four-time Stanley Cup winner with the New York Islanders.

Kallur played for Modo Hockey and Södertälje SK before moving to Djurgårdens IF in 1978. He was awarded Guldpucken as the best player of the 1978–79 season. He was signed by New York Islanders in 1979 and played his entire North American career with that team (except for two games with Indianapolis Checkers).

Together with fellow Swede Stefan Persson, Kallur was part of the first NHL team (1979-80 New York Islanders) to win a Stanley Cup with European-trained players on its roster.  Scottish-born Dunc Munro of the Montreal Maroons was the first European-born player to win the Stanley Cup. Kallur played with the Islanders during all four of their Stanley Cup championships from 1980 to 1983. He is currently a scout in the New York Rangers organization focusing on European prospects.

Anders Kallur is the father of Swedish athletes Jenny, Martin and Susanna Kallur.

Career statistics

Regular season and playoffs

International

References

External links 

1952 births
Living people
Djurgårdens IF Hockey players
Modo Hockey players
New York Islanders players
New York Islanders scouts
New York Rangers scouts
People from Ludvika Municipality
Södertälje SK players
Stanley Cup champions
Swedish expatriate ice hockey players in the United States
Swedish ice hockey right wingers
Undrafted National Hockey League players
Sportspeople from Dalarna County